The Union Pacific Railroad Depot in Concordia, Kansas, is a historic railroad depot that is listed on the National Register of Historic Places.  The building is one of many built by the Union Pacific Railroad to assist with the company's growth across the United States.

Restoration and current use
The building is no longer used as a railroad depot.  It has been restored and now houses the National Orphan Train Complex.  The complex hosts a museum and research center dedicated to the preservation of the stories and artifacts of those who were part of the Orphan Train Movement from 1854 to 1929.  The museum is open for research and is visited by around 4,000 people each year, one third of who are descendants of orphan train riders.

Image gallery

See also
 National Register of Historic Places listings in Cloud County, Kansas

References

External links
 National Orphan Train Museum

Railway stations on the National Register of Historic Places in Kansas
Union Pacific Railroad stations
National Register of Historic Places in Cloud County, Kansas
Child welfare in the United States
Adoption history
Former railway stations in Kansas